West Delhi Lok Sabha constituency is one of the seven Lok Sabha (parliamentary) constituencies in the National Capital Territory of Delhi. This constituency came into existence in 2008 as a part of the implementation of the recommendations of the Delimitation Commission of India constituted in 2002. Earlier some parts of the constituency were included in Outer Delhi constituency and some parts were included in the erstwhile South Delhi constituency.

Assembly segments
West Delhi Lok Sabha constituency presently comprises the following ten Vidhan Sabha (legislative assembly) constituencies:

Members of Parliament
The West Delhi Lok Sabha constituency was created in 2009. The list of Member of Parliament (MP) is as follows:

Election results

2019

2014

2009

See also
 List of Constituencies of the Lok Sabha
 Karol Bagh (Lok Sabha constituency)

References

Lok Sabha constituencies in Delhi
2008 establishments in Delhi
Constituencies established in 2008